The Anguilla national cricket team is the representative cricket team of Anguilla.

The team takes part in inter-regional cricket competitions in the Caribbean, but has only appeared in senior cricket twice, in the two Stanford 20/20 tournaments. For domestic first-class and List A purposes, Anguilla is subsumed into the Leeward Islands cricket team. The first Anguillian to play Test cricket for West Indies was Omari Banks in 2003.

History 
Representative cricket has been played by Anguilla since the late 1970s. Early games were played as part of the three-day (but not first-class) Heineken Challenge Trophy (the sponsored Leeward Islands Tournament), although at first the team was not a full participant and played only two games each year in the 1977, 1978 and 1979 tournaments.
The team suffered a run of heavy defeats in their early years; Anguilla's first win in the competition came against Montserrat in the 1980 tournament.

Notable players
Current Leeward Islands players
Montcin Hodge
Jahmar Hamilton
Kelbert Walters
Lyndel Richardson
Chesney Hughes
Yannick Leonard
Former Leeward Islands players
Omari Banks (2001 - 2013)
Chaka Hodge (2002 - 2008)
Alex Adams (1997 - 2005)
Lanville Harrigan (1988 - 2003)
Eustace Proctor (1986)

Other
Cardigan Connor (played English county cricket)

Stanford 20/20 

Anguilla's only games of senior cricket have come in Twenty20, as part of the Stanford 20/20 competitions in 2006 and 2007-08. Their debut at this level was against Barbados at the Stanford Cricket Ground in Coolidge, Antigua on 18 July 2006; Barbados won the match by 38 runs.
On 3 February 2008, they played Grenada, who won by 16 runs despite a 39-ball unbeaten 75 from Anguilla's Montcin Hodge.

2006 Stanford 20/20 Squad
Omari Banks
Alex Adams
Terrence Adams
Chaka Hodge
Montcin Hodge
Chesney Hughes
Leon Lake
Delano Mussington
Daniel Proctor
Lyndel Richardson
Irving Rogers
Delon Skellekie
Kelbert Walters

2007/2008 Stanford 20/20 Squad
Chaka Hodge
Omari Banks
Terrence Adams
Masimba Bowen
Marlon Bryson
Jahmar Hamilton
Montcin Hodge
Chesney Hughes
Junior Johnson
Leon Lake
Rondal Lake
Yannick Leonard
Daniel Proctor
Shridath Rey
Lyndel Richardson
Kelbert Walters

Source:2006 Squad 2007/08 Squad

Notes

C
National team
National cricket teams